The 1929 Notre Dame Fighting Irish football team was an American football team that represented the University of Notre Dame as an independent during the 1929 college football season. In their 12th year under head coach Knute Rockne, the Irish compiled a perfect 9–0 record and outscored opponents by a total of 145 to 38, with four shutouts. 

The Dickinson System rated Notre Dame No. 1 with 25.00 points, ahead of No. 2 Purdue (23.60), both from the State of Indiana. In later analyses, Notre Dame was also selected as the 1929 national champion by Billingsley Report, Boand System, Dickinson System, Dunkel System, College Football Researchers Association, Helms Athletic Foundation, National Championship Foundation, Poling System, and Jeff Sagarin's ELO-Chess system.

Two Notre Dame player, quarterback Frank Carideo and guard Jack Cannon, were consensus first-team players on the 1929 All-America college football team.

Coach Rockne was stricken with what was variously described as an infection or a blood clot in his right leg prior to the second game of the season against Navy. He was able to attend only two of the remaining game on the side lines. Assistant coach Tom Lieb served as the interim head coach. 

With the razing of Cartier Field, the team played no home games in South Bend, Indiana. Three "home" games were played at Soldier Field in Chicago. The new Notre Dame Stadium opened for the 1930 season.

Schedule

Personnel

Players

 Roy Bailie, end, 5'11", 163 pounds
 Bernard Bloemer, guard, 5'9", 162 pounds
 Gus Bondi, guard, 5'9", 175 pounds
 Bob Brannon, halfback, 5'9", 155 pounds
 Martin Brill, halfback, 5'11", 181 pounds
 Dan Cannon, halfback, 5'7-1/2", 163 pounds
 Jack Cannon, guard, 5'11", 193 pounds
 Jack Carberry, end, 6', 175 pounds
 Frank Carideo, quarterback, 5'7", 172 pounds
 James Carmody, tackle, 6', 190 pounds
 William Cassidy, guard, 5'9, 172 pounds
 Vincent Cavanaugh, center, 5'11", 181 pounds
 Bill Christman, quarterback, 5'7", 152 pounds
 Ed Collins, end, 6', 169 pounds
 John Colrick, end, 6', 175 pounds
 Tom Conley, end, 5'11", 170 pounds
 Pat Conway, fullback, 5'10", 162 pounds
 Carl Cronin, halfback, 5'7", 155 pounds
 Al Culver, tackle, 6'2-1/2", 212 pounds
 Richard Donoghue, tackle, 6'2", 220 pounds
 Bernard Donoghue, halfback, 5'10-1/2", 161 pounds
 John Elder, halfback, 5'8", 154 pounds
 Al Gebert, quarterback, 5'8", 160 pounds
 Jim Griffin, end, 6'1", 178 pounds
 Al Grisanti, end, 5'9", 155 pounds
 Norm Herwit, guard, 5'9", 185 pounds
 Paul Host, end, 5'11", 165 pounds
 Al Howard, fullback, 5'10", 160 pounds
 George Izoe, tackle, 6', 185 pounds
 Clarence Kaplan, halfback, 5'10", 158 pounds
 Tom L. Kassis, guard, 5'11", 185 pounds
 Bernard Keeney, quarterback, 5'8", 141 pounds
 Tom Kenneally, quarterback, 5'7", 145 pounds
 Frank Kersjes, end, 5'11", 180 pounds
 Mike Koken, halfback, 5'10", 165 pounds
 Frank Kosky, end, 6', 174 pounds
 Theodore Kremer, fullback, 5'10", 177 pounds
 John B. Law, guard and captain, 5'9", 163 pounds
 Bernie Leahy, halfback, 5'11", 178 pounds
 Frank Leahy, tackle, 5'11", 183 pounds
 Tom Listzwan, fullback, 5'8", 158 pounds
 Joseph Locke, guard, 5'10", 165 pounds
 Jim Lyons, guard, 5'11", 170 pounds
 Henry Mahoney, end, 5'10", 165 pounds
 John Manley, tackle, 5'11", 180 pounds
 Robert Massey, guard, 5'10", 165 pounds
 Art McManmon, tackle, 6'2", 201 pounds
 Regis McNamara, tackle, 6', 165 pounds
 Bert Metzger, guard, 5'9", 165 pounds
 Tim Moynihan, center, 6'1", 195 pounds
 Larry Mullins, fullback, 6', 175 pounds
 Emmett Murphy, quarterback, 5'10", 158 pounds
 Tom Murphy, end, 6'1", 185 pounds
 Joe Nash, center, 5'10-1/2", 177 pounds
 Ed O'Brien, halfback, 5'10", 172 pounds
 John O'Brien, end, 6'2", 180 pounds
 Paul O'Connor, fullback, 5'9", 175 pounds
 P. Provissero, guard, 5'8", 194 pounds
 Fred Reiman, center, 6'2", 186 pounds
 John Rogers, center, 5'9", 172 pounds
 Joe Savoldi, fullback, 5'11", 192 pounds
 Charles Schwartz, tackle, 5'9", 160 pounds
 Marchmont Schwartz, halfback, 5'10", 161 pounds
 Al Seymour, guard, 5'10", 174 pounds
 George Shay, fullback, 5'9", 160 ponds
 Joe Thornton, tackle, 5'9-1/2", 182 pounds
 Ted Twomey, tackle, 6', 195 pounds
 H. M. Vezie, end, 6', 175 pounds
 George Vlk, end, 6', 170 pounds
 Terrance Wharton, tackle, 6'1", 187 pounds
 Vincent Whelan, guard, 6', 165 pounds
 Aubrey Williams, fullback, 6'1", 181 pounds
 Thomas Yarr, center, 5'10", 185 pounds
 John Yelland, center, 6', 173 pounds
 Abe Zoss, guard, 5'11", 184 pounds

Staff

 Knute Rockne, head coach
 Tom Lieb, assistant coach and acting head coach
 Thomas A. Mills, assistant coach and scout
 John "Ike" Voedisch, assistant coach (end)
 Jack Chevigny, assistant coach (backfield)
 William Jones, freshman coach

Awards and honors
QB Frank Carideo (unanimous All-American)
G Jack Cannon (All-American)
T Ted Twommey (All-American)

References

Notre Dame
Notre Dame Fighting Irish football seasons
College football national champions
College football undefeated seasons
Notre Dame Fighting Irish football